Basile may refer to:

People

Surname
 Adriana Basile (c. 1590–c. 1640), Italian composer
 Alfio Basile (born 1943), Argentine football (soccer) coach and former player
 Arturo Basile (1914–1968), Italian conductor
 Emanuele Basile (died 1980), captain of Carabinieri murdered by Cosa Nostra
 Ernesto Basile (1857–1932), Italian architect
 Fabio Basile (born 1994), Italian judoka
 Giambattista Basile (1566/1575–1632), Italian poet, courtier, and fairy tale collector
 Gianluca Basile (born 1975), Italian basketball player
 Gloria Vitanza Basile (1922-2004), American novelist and songwriter
 Pierre Basile (died 1199), French knight who shot King Richard I of England with a crossbow at the siege of Châlus-Charbrol
 Rose Basile Green (1914-2003), American scholar, poet
 Jonathan Basile, creator of The Library of Babel website

Given name
 Basile Bouchon (fl. 1725), Lyon textile worker
 Basile M. Missir (1843-1929), Romanian politician

Places
 Basile, Louisiana, United States
 Edmundston-Saint Basile, New Brunswick, Canada
 Pico Basilé, Bioko, the highest mountain of Equatorial Guinea
 Pico Basilé National Park

See also
 Basil (disambiguation)
 Vasily (disambiguation), in Cyrillic, the letter V is shown as a B